Al Zubara Fort, also known as Fort Zubara(h), Zubara(h) Fort, Al Zubarah Fort, or Az Zubara(h) Fort, is a historic Qatari military fortress built under the oversight of Sheikh Abdullah bin Jassim Al Thani in 1938.

History

Al Zubara Fort was originally built by Sheikh Abdullah bin Jassim al Thani in 1938 to serve as a Coast Guard station, although some utter that it was built to serve as a police station. It was later renovated into a museum to display diverse exhibits and artworks, most especially for contemporarily topical archaeological findings.

Geography

Al Zubara Fort is situated in the ancient town of Zubarah, which in turn is located on the northwestern coast of the Qatar peninsula in the Al Shamal municipality, and is about 105 km from the Capital of Qatar .

Zubarah

Zubarah ( "Zubarah"), also known as Al Zubarah or Az Zubarah, the town in which Al Zubara Fort is situated, is a deserted town located on the northwestern coast of the Qatari Peninsula, in the municipality of Al Shamal, which in turn, is about 105 km from Doha, the capital city and state of Qatar (The geography of both Zubarah and Al Zubara Fort are the same since the latter is located in Zubarah). Zubarah covers an area of approximately 400 hectares and about 60 hectares inside the outer town wall. Zubarah as a whole is the largest archaeological site in the whole Qatari Peninsula.

It was once a thriving pearl fishing and trading port positioned midway between the Strait of Hormuz and the west arm of the Persian Gulf. It is one of the largest and best preserved examples of an 18th-19th century merchant town in the Persian Gulf region. The entire layout and urban fabric of a settlement dating to this formative period in the region have been preserved. The Zubarah archaeological site provides an important insight into urban life, spatial organization, and the social and economic history of the Persian Gulf before the discovery of oil and gas in the 20th century.

Structure

Lofty, compact walls, substantial and profuse in broadness, swathe this eminent fort which are one meter in length and bulk. It was said that the walls of the fort were fabricated and were put together by merging and blending overlapping raw pieces of coral stones, specifically limestone, with a mortar and a pestle specifically conceived for grinding mud. The fort has a protective roof that was jury-rigged by utilizing compressed mud. The roof endows shade and coolness for the ones inside the fort. The fort's roof was also erected for the soldiers who would patrol and traverse the surrounding areas for enemies. The fort has three, gargantuan yet superbly conceived corners, each having massive, circular towers on top, which are geared with diverse varieties of Qatari-style defenses, with the fourth one as the most picturesque corner, as it has a rectangular tower with exquisite triangular-based ledges with slits that are called machicolations. Of course, the soldiers themselves had their own respective rooms. Eight rooms were constructed to accommodate such valiant and patriotic soldiers which are situated in the ground floor. These rooms were just converted recently to house exhibits, artworks and other archaeological findings. The fort has external staircases which were used to climb up to the fort's floors and roof.

For more information about the Al Zubara Fort's structure, see the table below.

The well
The well once provided fresh drinking water all year round, but today, like other wells in the area it is completely dry. Dug by hand through the hard dammam limestone the well reached down to a thin band of fresh water. If it were dug too deep the water would become salty. Rubble in the bottom means we do not know exactly how deep this well is, but it goes down at least ten metres.

Schedule

Today, Al Zubara Fort serves as a museum and a famous landmark. As a result, a schedule for opening and closing the fort for visitors and tourists is needed. The fort is open regularly from 8 a.m. until 6 p.m. except for early Friday mornings and Saturdays.

Gallery

See also
Barzan Tower
Al Koot Fort

References

External links

Qatar Tourism Authority - Forts
Al Zubarah Fort Qatar Visitor
Embassy of Qatar - Major Museums & Forts 
 Traditional architecture in Qatar

Forts in Qatar
1938 establishments in Qatar